Henry Allen Foster (May 7, 1800May 11, 1889) was an American lawyer and politician from New York. He served one term in the U.S. House of Representatives from 1837 to 1839 and was briefly a United States senator  from 1844 to 1845.

Life
His family moved to Cazenovia, New York when he was a boy. He was admitted to the bar in 1822, and commenced practice in Rome, New York.

He was Surrogate Judge of Oneida County from 1827 to 1831, and from 1835 to 1839, and Rome's Town Supervisor from 1829 to 1830, and from 1833 to 1834. He was a member of the New York State Senate (5th District) from 1831 to 1834, and from 1841 to 1844, sitting in the 54th, 55th, 56th, 57th, 64th, 65th, 66th and 67th New York State Legislatures.

Congress 

Foster was elected as a Democrat to the 25th United States Congress, holding office from March 4, 1837, to March 3, 1839. Afterwards, he resumed the practice of law in Rome, New York. He was appointed as a Democrat to the United States Senate to fill the vacancy caused by the resignation of Silas Wright, and served from November 30, 1844, to January 27, 1845, when a successor was elected by the State Legislature.

Later career and death 
He was a justice of the New York Supreme Court (5th D.) from 1864 to 1871, and was ex officio a judge of the New York Court of Appeals in 1870.  He was later President of the Board of Trustees of Hamilton College and Vice President of the American Colonization Society.

He died on May 11, 1899, and was buried at the Rome Cemetery in Rome, New York.

References

The New York Civil List compiled by Franklin Benjamin Hough (pages 128ff, 133f, 140 and 415; Weed, Parsons and Co., 1858)

1800 births
1889 deaths
Democratic Party New York (state) state senators
Politicians from Hartford, Connecticut
Politicians from Rome, New York
New York Supreme Court Justices
Judges of the New York Court of Appeals
Town supervisors in New York (state)
Democratic Party United States senators from New York (state)
Democratic Party members of the United States House of Representatives from New York (state)
People from Cazenovia, New York
19th-century American politicians
Lawyers from Hartford, Connecticut
19th-century American judges
19th-century American lawyers